Aculops tetanothrix, also known as the willow gall mite, is a species of mite that belongs to the family Eriophydae. The mite is yellow, with brown or sometimes orange.

Aculops tetanothrix creates galls on Salix (willow) species. The galls initially are green, and later turn red.

References

Eriophyidae
Animals described in 1889
Arachnids of Europe
Taxa named by Alfred Nalepa
Willow galls